Amparo de São Francisco is a municipality located in the Brazilian state of Sergipe. Its population was 2,380 (2020) and its area is 35 km².

References

Municipalities in Sergipe